Yo-Kai Watch Shadowside Oni-o no Fukkatsu is a 2017 supernatural anime film produced by OLM, Inc. and distributed by Toho. It is the fourth film in the Yo-kai Watch film series, following the 2016 film Yo-kai Watch: Soratobu Kujira to Double no Sekai no Daibōken da Nyan!, and features characters from Shigeru Mizuki's GeGeGe no Kitarō manga. It is directed by Shinji Ushiro and written by Yoichi Kato, with Level-5 president Akihiro Hino overseeing the production, including the film's script. It was released on Japanese theaters on December 16, 2017 and on DVD on July 4, 2018.

Plot
Taking place 30 years after the events of the anime, There was once an 11-year-old fifth grader named Nathan Adams who held a wristwatch that could command Yo-kai, he would make friends with the Yo-kai and fulfill a great many deeds. But when Nathan grew up and married Katie, he lost his ability to see Yo-kai. And as for the wristwatch that could control Yo-kai, its existence threatened to disturb the balance between human and Yo-kai worlds, so it was cast away into oblivion beyond time and space. Soon ... the story of the Yo-kai controlling wristwatch became but a legend. But then, something took place after many, many years had passed ... an epidemic Yo-kai virus known as Onimaro started affecting people with malevolent intentions and is spreading indefinitely, turning them into Kaodeka Oni and causing chaos throughout the city. With the end near, only the ones chosen by a new Yo-kai Watch can stand up against the upcoming threat and would save both Yo-kai and humans from certain destruction.

Characters

Returning cast

New characters
But eventually survived after being saved by someone. She is chosen by the new Yo-kai Watch, the Yo-kai Watch Elder, allowing her to harness the power of summoning Yo-kai to protect both Yo-kai and humans from the Demon King.
Due to this, he is often bullied by his peers and harbors hatred towards everyone, never wanting to mingle with anyone. He is cursed by one of Rasen's followers, bestowing him the Kigan Gear, an item used spread evil and malice. Later in the film, the Kigan Gear transformed into the Yo-kai Watch Ogre allowing him fight against the Onimaro and the Demon King.
Unlike the two, he can use spells and incantations to take down Yo-kai.
He lives with his father,  (Voiced by Bin Shimada) and looks after the humans while being a mediator between Humans and Yo-kai. He got involved with the events of the Onimaro and the arrival of the Demon King, with him assisting Touma and Natsume on stopping him.
She harbors a slight crush on Kitaro and despises Nezumi Otoko.
He plans to rule the world using the powers of the Onimaro.
He was sealed away several years ago before being resurrected in the present time. He has the power to harness a human/Yo-kai's "inner darkness" and make them fall under his command.

Production
First announced on the screening of Yo-kai Watch: Soratobu Kujira to Double no Sekai no Daibōken da Nyan! greeting event on December 4, 2016. The film was first revealed in the July Issue of Shogakukan's CoroCoro Comic magazine, briefly detailing about the next film and the new Lightside and Shadowside forms of the Yo-kai featured in the film. The film's official plot and characters were revealed more in the official movie website alongside the staff working in the movie. Akihiro Hino stated the movie is a "completely new horror comedy" and that will be more scarier and funnier compared to the previous films. Aside from the elements, the characters that are revealed in the film will have darker backstories and each Yo-kai debuting in the film has its own Lightside and Shadowside forms. Level-5 later announced in September that a crossover with the manga series GeGeGe no Kitarō, with veteran voice actor Masako Nozawa revisiting and reprising her role as Kitaro.

In later announcements for the film, the voice actors for the two main characters were revealed, with Yudai Chiba voicing Touma and Mone Kamishiraishi voicing Summer. In October 27, the main movie website was updated, revealing more voice actors who would reprise their roles for the film, however Takaya Kuroda and Daisuke Hirakawa will now both voice Jibanyan and Komasan replacing both Etsuko Kozakura and Aya Endō respectively. The voice actors for Medama-Oyaji, Neko-Musume and Nezumi Otoko are also revealed In that same date, the second promotional video was released.

Music
Series composer Kenichirō Saigō wrote the film's score for its original release.

Release
The film is released on December 16, 2017 and on DVD July 4, 2018 in Japan. Early pre orders of the movie tickets allows viewers to obtain an Fudoh Myoh-Oh Amulet Card. The card can be scanned through the Nintendo 3DS to obtain the character in Yokai Watch Busters 2 game.

Reception
The film earned 399 million yen in its first week, debuting 2nd in the Japanese Box Office behind Star Wars: The Last Jedi. It stayed in the 2nd spot within the 2nd and 3rd week, before falling to 5th place.

Sequel
Though no new films were announced in the post-credits scene, the film is followed by the anime series Yo-kai Watch Shadowside, released on April 13, 2018. Yo-kai Watch: Forever Friends, a film prequel to the original anime series, was released in Japanese theaters on December 14, 2018.

References

External links
  
 

Yo-kai Watch films
2017 anime films
Adventure anime and manga
Animated adventure films
Supernatural anime and manga
Japanese fantasy adventure films
Japanese animated fantasy films
Toho animated films
2010s fantasy adventure films
Anime films based on video games
OLM, Inc. animated films